Mighty Casey might refer to:

 Mighty Casey, the protagonist of the poem "Casey at the Bat"
 "The Mighty Casey", a 1960 episode of The Twilight Zone
 Mighty Casey (musician), a music artist signed to Lewis Recordings
 Mighty Casey Backyard Railroad, a rideable miniature railway system from Remco
 Mighty Casey's, a defunct restaurant chain